C34 or C-34 may refer to:

Vehicles 
Aircraft
 Castel C.34 Condor, a French sailplane
 Cessna C-34, an American civil utility aircraft
 Douglas C-34, an American military transport aircraft

Automobiles
 Nissan Laurel C34, a Japanese sedan
 Sauber C34, a Swiss Formula One car

Locomotives
 New South Wales C34 class locomotive, an Australian steam locomotive

Ships
 , a C-class submarine of the Royal Navy
 , a Tiger-class light cruiser of the Royal Navy

Other uses 
 C-34 Mosquito Impoundment Project, a pest-control project in Florida
 C34 road (Namibia)
 Caldwell 34, a supernova remnant in the constellation Cygnus
 King's Knight's Gambit, a chess opening
 Lung cancer
 Special Committee on Peacekeeping Operations of the United Nations